Luka Kerin (born 23 March 1999) is a Slovenian football player who plays as a winger for Slovenian PrvaLiga club Bravo.

Honours
Celje
Slovenian PrvaLiga: 2019–20

References

1999 births
Living people
People from Brežice
Slovenian footballers
Slovenia youth international footballers
Association football wingers
Association football forwards
Slovenian PrvaLiga players
NK Krško players
NK Celje players
NK Bravo players
Slovenian expatriate footballers
Slovenian expatriate sportspeople in Italy
Expatriate footballers in Italy